Erik Chitty (8 July 1907 in Dover, Kent – 22 July 1977 Brent, Middlesex), was an English stage, film and television actor.

Early life
Chitty was the son of a flour miller, Frederick Walter Chitty and his wife Ethel Elsie Assistance née Franklin; they married in 1902. He attended Dover College and Jesus College, Cambridge, where he was one of the founders of the Cambridge University Mummers, before training at RADA and becoming a professional actor. He then ran his own repertory company in Frinton-on-Sea.

Personal life
Chitty and former actress Hester Bevan married 1936, and they had two daughters and one son. He was also a keen genealogist.

Television career

Early television (1936–1939)
Chitty was an early player in the fledgling BBC television output, which started in November 1936 until it was closed at the beginning of WWII.
 Pyramus And Thisbe,  23 July 1937, Snout
Rosencrantz and Guildenstern,  2 March 1938, Guildenstern
Henry IV 22 March 1938, "Valet" 
The White Chateau, 11 November 1938, Trooper of Uhlans/Orderly/Linesman
 Ednas Fruit Hat,  27 January 1939, Cousin Sid
 The Tempest, 5 February 1939, Boatswain
 The Unquiet Spirit, 7 March 1939 "Hall Porter"
 Katharine and Petruchio, 12 April 1939, "A Tailor"
Annajanska, The Bolsjevik Empress 2 May 1939, "Stammfest" 
The Day is Gone, 4 August 1939, Radio announcer's voice 
The Advantages of Paternity 12 May 1939, "Brunov"

Television postwar (1946 onwards)
His television credits included a major role as the aged "Mr Smith" in Please Sir!, and multiple appearances in Dads Army, Raffles, Doctor Who, Danger Man, Maigret, Man About the House and The Goodies. He appeared in the TV musical Pickwick for the BBC in 1969.

Filmography

 Contraband (1940) – Cloakroom attendant (uncredited)
 Oliver Twist (1948) – Workhouse Board member (uncredited)
 Forbidden (1949) – Schofield
 All Over the Town (1949) – Frobisher
 Your Witness (1950) – Judge's clerk
 Chance of a Lifetime (1950) – Silas Pike 
 Circle of Danger (1951) - Box-office clerk (uncredited)
 John Wesley (1954) – Trustee of Georgia
 Time Is My Enemy (1954) – Ballistics expert
 Raising a Riot (1955) – Mr Buttons (uncredited)
 Footsteps in the Fog (1955) – Hedges
 Windfall (1955) – (uncredited)
 After the Ball (1957) – Waiter
 Zoo Baby (1957) – Vulture man
 Left Right and Centre (1959) – Deputy returning officer
 The Devil's Disciple (1959) – Uncle Titus
 The Day They Robbed the Bank of England (1960) – Gudgeon (uncredited)
 Not a Hope in Hell (1960) – Joe
 Raising the Wind (1961) – Elderly Man at concert
 Follow That Man (1961) – Doctor
 First Men in the Moon (1964) – Gibbs, Cavor's hired man (uncredited)
 The Horror of It All (1964) – Grandpa Marley
 Doctor Zhivago (1965) – Old Soldier
 Casino Royale (1967) – Sir James Bond's butler (uncredited)
 Bedazzled (1967) – Seed – Sir Stanley Moon's butler (uncredited)
 Anne of the Thousand Days (1969) – Priest (uncredited)
 Arthur? Arthur! (1969) – Uncle Ratty
 A Nice Girl Like Me (1969) – Vicar
 Twinky (1969) – Lawyer's elderly client
 Song of Norway (1970) – Helsted
 The Railway Children (1970) – Photographer
 Lust for a Vampire (1971) – Professor Herz
 The Statue (1971) – Mouser
 Please Sir! (1971) – Mr Smith
 The Amazing Mr. Blunden (1972) – Mr Claverton
 The Vault of Horror (1973) – Old waiter (segment 1 "Midnight Mess")
 Op de Hollandse toer (1973) – Mr Molenaar
 The Flying Sorcerer (1973) – Sir Roger
 Fall of Eagles (1974) - Hertling, German Chancellor
 One of Our Dinosaurs Is Missing (1975) – Museum guard
 The Bawdy Adventures of Tom Jones (1976) – Sam (uncredited)
 The Seven-Per-Cent Solution (1976) – The butler
 Jabberwocky (1977) – Second door-opener / Servant (uncredited)
 A Bridge Too Far (1977) – Organist

Notes

References

External links

Erik Chitty – BBC Guide to Comedy
Erik Chitty – Movies.com website

1907 births
1977 deaths
20th-century English male actors
20th-century English historians
Alumni of Jesus College, Cambridge
Alumni of RADA
English genealogists
English male film actors
English male stage actors
English male television actors
Male actors from Kent
People educated at Dover College
People from Dover, Kent